Thomas Niu Huiqing (18 September 1895 - 28 February 1973) was a Chinese Catholic priest and bishops of the Roman Catholic Diocese of Funing and Yanggu.

Biography
Niu was born in Xinhe County, Hebei, on September 18, 1895, during the late Qing dynasty (1644–1911). He was ordained a priest on September 30, 1923. On January 12, 1943, he was appointed Apostolic vicariate of the Roman Catholic Diocese of Yanggu in Shandong, and ordained titular bishop on April 4 of that year. When Yanggu became diocese in 1946, he became its first ordained bishop. He left Yanggu during the Chinese Civil War and went to Funing in Fujian in 1948. Later he was appointed Apostolic Administrator of the Roman Catholic Diocese of Chiayi in Taiwan in 1958. He died on February 28, 1973.

References

1895 births
1973 deaths
People from Xinhe County, Hebei
20th-century Roman Catholic bishops in China